The Penitent Thief, also known as the Good Thief, Wise Thief, Grateful Thief, or Thief on the Cross, is one of two unnamed thieves in Luke's account of the crucifixion of Jesus in the New Testament.  The Gospel of Luke describes him asking Jesus to "remember him" when Jesus comes into his kingdom.  The other, as the impenitent thief, challenges Jesus to save himself and both of them to prove that he is the Messiah.

He is officially venerated in the Catholic Church.  The Roman Martyrology places his commemoration on 25 March, together with the Feast of the Annunciation, because of the ancient Christian tradition that Christ (and the penitent thief) were crucified and died exactly on the anniversary of Christ's incarnation.

He is given the name Dismas in the Gospel of Nicodemus and is traditionally known in Catholicism as Saint Dismas (sometimes Dysmas; in Spanish and Portuguese, Dimas). Other traditions have bestowed other names:
 In Coptic Orthodox tradition and the Narrative of Joseph of Arimathea, he is named Demas.
 In the Codex Colbertinus, he is named Zoatham or Zoathan.
 In the Arabic Infancy Gospel, he is named Titus.
 In Russian Orthodox tradition, he is named Rakh (Russian: Рах).

Gospel of Luke

Narrative

Two men were crucified at the same time as Jesus, one on his right and one on his left, which the Gospel of Mark interprets as fulfillment of the prophecy of Isaiah 53:12 ("And he was numbered with the transgressors"). According to the Gospels of Matthew and Mark, respectively, both of the thieves mocked Jesus; Luke, however, relates:

Attempts have been made to reconcile the apparent contradiction between Luke's account and that of Mark and Matthew. Augustine of Hippo suggested that the authors of Mark and Matthew, for the sake of concision, employed a figure of speech whereby the plural was put for the singular. Later commentators, such as Frederic Farrar, have drawn attention to the difference between the Greek words used: "The two first Synoptists tell us that both the robbers during an early part of the hours of crucifixion reproached Jesus (ὠνείδιζον), but we learn from St Luke that only one of them used injurious and insulting language to Him (ἐβλασφήμει)."

"Amen ... today ... in paradise"

The phrase translated "Amen, I say to you, today you will be in paradise" in Luke 23:43 ("Ἀμήν σοι λέγω σήμερον μετ’ ἐμοῦ ἔσῃ ἐν τῷ παραδείσῳ." Amén soi légo sémeron met' emoû ése en tôi paradeísoi) is disputed in a minority of versions and commentaries. The Greek manuscripts are without punctuation, so attribution of the adverb "today" to the verb "be", as "Amen I say to you, today you will be with me in paradise" (the majority view), or the verb "say", as "Amen I say to you today, you will be with me in paradise" (the minority view), is dependent on analysis of word order conventions in Koine Greek. The majority of ancient Bible translations also follow the majority view, with only the Aramaic language Curetonian Gospels offering significant testimony to the minority view. As a result, some prayers recognize the good thief as the only person confirmed as a saint—that is, a person known to be in Paradise after death—by the Bible, and by Jesus himself. Thomas Aquinas wrote:

Unnamed

Only the Gospel of Luke describes one of the criminals as penitent, and that gospel does not name him.

Augustine of Hippo does not name the thief, but wonders if he might not have been baptized at some point.

According to tradition, the Good Thief was crucified to Jesus' right and the other thief was crucified to his left. For this reason, depictions of the crucifixion of Jesus often show Jesus' head inclined to his right, showing his acceptance of the Good Thief. In the Russian Orthodox Church, both crucifixes and crosses are usually made with three bars: the top one, representing the titulus (the inscription that Pontius Pilate wrote and was nailed above Jesus' head); the longer crossbar on which Jesus' hands were nailed; and a slanted bar at the bottom representing the footrest to which Jesus' feet were nailed. The footrest is slanted, pointing up towards the Good Thief, and pointing down towards the other.

According to John Chrysostom, the thief dwelt in the desert and robbed or murdered anyone unlucky enough to cross his path. According to Pope Gregory I, he "was guilty of blood, even his brother's blood" (fratricide).

Named

"Dismas"
Luke's unnamed penitent thief was later assigned the name Dismas in an early Greek recension of the Acta Pilati and the Latin Gospel of Nicodemus, portions of which may be dated to the late fourth century. The name "Dismas" may have been adapted from a Greek word meaning "sunset" or "death". The other thief's name is given as Gestas. In Syriac Infancy Gospel's Life of the Good Thief (Histoire Du Bon Larron French 1868, English 1882), Augustine of Hippo said, the thief said to Jesus, the child: "O most blessed of children, if ever a time should come when I shall crave Thy Mercy, remember me and forget not what has passed this day."

Anne Catherine Emmerich saw the Holy Family "exhausted and helpless"; according to Augustine of Hippo and Peter Damian, the Holy Family met Dismas, in these circumstances. Pope Theophilus of Alexandria (385–412) wrote a Homily on the Crucifixion and the Good Thief, which is a classic of Coptic literature.

"Demas"
In Coptic Orthodoxy, he is named Demas. This is the name given to him in the Narrative of Joseph of Arimathea.

"Titus"
The apocryphal Syriac Infancy Gospel calls the two thieves Titus and Dumachus, and adds a tale about how Titus (the good one) prevented the other thieves in his company from robbing Mary and Joseph during their flight into Egypt.

"Rakh"
In the Russian tradition, the Good Thief's name is "Rakh" (Russian: Рах).

Sainthood
The Catholic Church remembers the Good Thief on 25 March. In the Roman Martyrology, the following entry is given: "Commemoration of the holy thief in Jerusalem who confessed to Christ and canonized him by Jesus himself on the cross at that moment and merited to hear from him: 'Today you will be with me in Paradise.
A number of towns, including San Dimas, California, are named after him. Also, parish churches are named after him, such as the Church of the Good Thief in Kingston, Ontario, Canada—built by convicts at nearby Kingston Penitentiary, Saint Dismas Church in Waukegan, Illinois, the Old Catholic Parish of St Dismas in Coseley and the Church of St. Dismas, the Good Thief, a Catholic church at the Clinton Correctional Facility in Dannemora, New York.

The Eastern Orthodox Church remembers him on Good Friday, along with the crucifixion. The Synaxarion offers this couplet in his honor:
Eden's locked gates the Thief has opened wide,
By putting in the key, "Remember me."

He is commemorated in a traditional Eastern Orthodox prayer said before receiving the eucharist: "I will not speak of Thy Mystery to Thine enemies, neither like Judas will I give Thee a kiss; but like the thief will I confess Thee: Remember me, O Lord in Thy Kingdom."

Art

In the Eastern Orthodox Church, one of the hymns of Good Friday is entitled, "The Good Thief" (or "The Wise Thief", Church Slavonic: "Razboinika blagorazumnago"), and speaks of how Christ granted Dismas Paradise. Several compositions of this hymn  are used in the Russian Orthodox Church and form one of the highlights of the Matins service on Good Friday.

In Samuel Beckett's Waiting for Godot, the main characters Vladimir and Estragon briefly discuss the inconsistencies between the Four Evangelists' accounts of the penitent and impenitent thieves. Vladimir concludes that since only Luke says that one of the two was saved, "then the two of them must have been damned [...] why believe him rather than the others?"

In popular culture
The thief features in Christian popular music, as in Christian rock band Third Day's 1995 song "Thief", and the name of the Christian rock band Dizmas. The thief is the narrator in Sydney Carter's controversial song "Friday Morning".

He is portrayed by Stelio Savante in the award-winning Good Friday film Once We Were Slaves directed by Dallas Jenkins

St. Dismas is central to the early plot of the video game Uncharted 4: A Thief's End in which treasure hunter Nathan Drake uses a St. Dismas statue to aid in his search for pirate treasure.

Dismas is the name of one of two starting characters in the video game Darkest Dungeon. He is also referred to as a rogue, thief, and highwayman in the in-game descriptions. A comic showing his backstory, as well as in-game item descriptions, implies that he is attempting to redeem himself after killing an innocent woman and her child. A special achievement is granted if both starting characters reach the game's final challenge, fittingly titled "On the old road, we found redemption."

In the 1967 romantic comedy caper film Fitzwilly, butler mastermind Claude Fitzwilliam (Dick Van Dyke) and his larcenous staff operate St. Dismas Thrift Shoppe in Philadelphia, a fictional charity where they send and store their stolen loot.

St. Dismas is prominently mentioned throughout the 1946 film The Hoodlum Saint starring William Powell, Esther Williams and Angela Lansbury.

Dismas Hardy is the main protagonist in a series of legal and crime thriller novels by John Lescroart.

In the 2022 film Clerks III, Elias mentions the Good Thief multiple times, quoting him as saying "Jesus did no wrong, whereas we are but thieves". In a running gag, everybody hears "but thieves" as "butt thieves" and wonders out loud what that means.

See also 
 Impenitent thief  Gestas, the other thief crucified alongside Jesus
 Life of Jesus in the New Testament
 Passion (Christianity)
 List of names for the biblical nameless
 Saint Dismas, patron saint archive
San Dimas  A city named after the Penitent Thief

References

External links

 The Wise Thief hymn from Eastern Orthodox Good Friday service (in English)
 Saint Dismas – Freebase

Christian saints from the New Testament
10s births
30s deaths
Christian folklore
Gospel of Luke
Followers of Jesus
People executed by crucifixion
 
Saints from the Holy Land
Year of birth unknown
Unnamed people of the Bible